BTC 9: Rampage is a mixed martial arts event produced by the BTC Fight Promotions that took place on February 29, 2020 at The Kitchener Memorial Auditorium (The Aud) in Kitchener, Ontario.

Background
The card was headlined by former UFC fighter Jesse Ronson and "Dana White: Lookin' for a Fight" alum Troy Lamson.

The co-main event featured former BTC Lightweight champion Adam Assenza taking on UFC veteran Cody Pfister.

The fight card was originally set to be the promotional debut of Kitchener fighter Pat Pytlik.

Fight card

References 

Mixed martial arts events